Zest Airways operated from a hub at Ninoy Aquino International Airport until its merger with AirAsia Philippines in 2015.

Asia

East Asia
People's Republic of China
Quanzhou - Quanzhou Jinjiang Airport 
Shanghai - Shanghai Pudong International Airport
South Korea
Seoul - Incheon International Airport

Southeast Asia

Philippines
Luzon
Manila - Ninoy Aquino International Airport Main Hub
Puerto Princesa - Puerto Princesa International Airport
Mindanao
Davao - Francisco Bangoy International Airport
Cagayan de Oro - Laguindingan Airport 
Visayas
Bacolod - Bacolod–Silay Airport
Cebu - Mactan–Cebu International Airport Hub
Iloilo - Iloilo International Airport
Kalibo - Kalibo International Airport
Tacloban - Daniel Z. Romualdez Airport
Tagbilaran - Tagbilaran Airport

Terminated destinations
Asia
East Asia
China - Chengdu
Hong Kong
Macau
South Korea - Busan, Cheongju, Daegu, Muan
Taiwan - Taipei (charter)
Southeast Asia
Malaysia - Sandakan
Philippines
Luzon - Baguio, Basco, Busuanga, Cauayan, Clark, Daet, Laoag, Legazpi, Marinduque, Masbate,  Naga, San Jose (Mindoro), Tablas, Taytay, Tuguegarao, Virac
Mindanao - Dipolog, Jolo, Pagadian, Surigao, Tandag, Tawi-Tawi, Zamboanga
Visayas - Calbayog, Catarman, Caticlan, San Jose (Antique)
Singapore
Oceania
Palau - Koror

References

https://web.archive.org/web/20090817230608/http://www.mb.com.ph/articles/213962/zest-air-eyes-dmia-hub-int-l-flights

Lists of airline destinations